MH370: The Plane That Disappeared is a British docuseries released on Netflix and directed by Louise Malkinson about the 2014 disappearance of Malaysia Airlines Flight 370. 

Many reviewers took exception to the series' presentation of the theories surrounding the loss of the aircraft, concluding that Netflix provided a platform for conspiracy theory proponents.

Premise
On 8 March 2014, Malaysia Airlines Flight 370 and all 239 passengers onboard disappeared without a trace. After nine years, family members, scientists, investigators, and journalists are still actively seeking explanations. The series "deliberately peddles conspiracy theories" attempting to explain the plane's disappearance.

Episodes

Release
Netflix began streaming all three episodes of the docuseries on the ninth anniversary of the disappearance, 8 March 2023.

Reception
Rohan Naahar of The Indian Express called the series "Ludicrous", saying that it "deliberately peddles conspiracy theories". 

Nick Schager of The Daily Beast said the series details 3 "dubious" explanations for the plane's disappearance, and "wallows in murky and absurd waters" but  provides "illuminating context for why some chose to believe the unbelievable".

Meera Suresh of The Week said the series was "A lame attempt that pushes conspiracy theories", reporting that "the biggest of all the mysteries would be why Netflix offered these theorists a platform to peddle their illogical, unscientific and outlandish ideas. This three-part docuseries is nothing but a podium for baseless theories offering cheap thrill at the cost of the poor souls who went missing and their relatives." The review also pointed out problems with the conspiracy theories highlighted in each episode, as follows: 
Episode 1: "...the docuseries shows no such mercy as Zaharie [the pilot] is brutally dissected here for purposefully crashing the plane, all with no proof."
Episode 2: "...nothing can salvage the illogical conspiracy theory offered by Jeff Wise as his "idea that the flight was hijacked by Russians...from the electronics bay...is preposterous."
Episode 3: "So offensive and galling" is [French journalist Florence de Changy's] theory that U.S. jets shot down the flight, that "it feels somehow disrespectful to have led an ear to it."

Richard Roeper of the Chicago Sun-Times called the series compelling, concluding its review with "So many of the theories we see explored in MH370: The Plane That Disappeared are outlandish, not fully formed, difficult to believe. And yet... we know something bizarre and tragic occurred."

Philip Sledge of CinemaBlend reported that "while you shouldn’t go in expecting a great deal of answers, the questions posed throughout add a level of intrigue to the mysterious story." It also said that the series rating of TV-14 differs from most true crime documentaries on Netflix due to mature themes and language.

Joel Keller of Decider said the conspiracy theories presented "are well-presented, with [investigative reporter Jeff] Wise being the 'expert' that anchors all of those theories into some aspect of reality." It concluded "your enjoyment of this docuseries is really going to hinge on whether you bought into the theories posited by [investigative reporter] Wise, his fellow journalists and aviation experts. That’s really the only way that the viewing experience doesn’t become a frustrating rabbit hole of conspiracy theories and little else."

See also
Malaysia Airlines Flight 370 disappearance theories

References

External links
 
 

Documentary television series about aviation
English-language Netflix original programming
Netflix original documentary television series
Malaysia Airlines Flight 370
2020s British documentary television series
2023 British television series debuts
2020s British television miniseries
Television shows about aviation accidents or incidents
Conspiracy theories involving aviation incidents